The 1997–1998 FIG Artistic Gymnastics World Cup series was a series of stages where events in men's and women's artistic gymnastics were contested. The International Gymnastics Federation revived the World Cup, an event which was not held since 1990, as a two-year long competition, culminating at a final event — the World Cup Final in 1998. A number of qualifier stages were held. The top 3 gymnast in each apparatus at the qualifier events would receive medals and prize money. Gymnasts who finished in the top 8 would also receive points that would be added up to a ranking which would qualify individual gymnasts for the biennial World Cup Final.

Stages

Medalists

Men

Women

Medal table

Overall

Men

Women

References

Artistic Gymnastics World Cup
1997 in gymnastics
1998 in gymnastics